Celebrity Mastermind is a celebrity version of Mastermind, a British television quiz show broadcast by BBC television. It began in 2002 as a one-off special, expanding to the current arrangement of 10 episodes, broadcast during December and January. It was originally hosted by John Humphrys, who also hosted the main show from 2003 to 2021.

Format
The format is the same as the standard show, although each episode is treated as a single contest with the winner receiving a trophy, and the contestant's fees being donated to charity.

History
The original BBC version of Mastermind, hosted by Magnus Magnusson, was broadcast on BBC One from 1972 to 1997. While other versions continued on radio and satellite television, the show did not return to BBC Television until 2002, with a one-off episode, the Mastermind Celebrity Special, originally broadcast on 30 December 2002 on BBC Two to celebrate the 30th anniversary of the first ever Mastermind final. The original host, Magnus Magnusson, was brought back for this special.

This was a precursor to the main show also being returned to the BBC with a new host, John Humphrys. The first series of the main show hosted by Humphrys began on BBC Two on 7 July 2003. The celebrity version then also aired on BBC Two for a first full series of three episodes in December 2003/January 2004, also hosted by Humphrys.

The celebrity version of the show has continued every year since, alongside the main show. Although the main show has remained on BBC Two, the celebrity version was promoted to BBC One from series 2 onward.

Episodes

2002 Special
(Winners listed in bold)

Series 1 (2003–04)
(Winners listed in bold)

Series 2 (2004)
(Winners listed in bold)

Series 3 (2004)
(Winners listed in bold)

Series 4 (2005–06)
(Winners listed in bold)

Series 5 (2006–07)
(Winners listed in bold)

Series 6 (2007–08)
(Winners listed in bold)

Series 7 (2008–09)

Series 8 (2009–10)

Series 9 (2010–11)

Series 10 (2011–12)

Series 11 (2012–13)

Series 12 (2013–14)

Series 13 (2014–15)

Series 14 (2015–16)

Series 15 (2016–17)

Series 16 (2017–18)

Series 17 (2018–19)

Series 18 (2019–20)

Series 19 (2020–21)

Series 20 (2022)

Series 21 (2022–23)

Transmissions

Trophy
The trophy presented to each winner was originally a commemorative glass bowl. The current trophy (2015–2016 series) is a wedge-shaped piece of glass.

References

External links

2000s British game shows
2010s British game shows
2020s British game shows
2002 British television series debuts
BBC television game shows
Celebrity competitions
English-language television shows
Quiz games
Television series by Hat Trick Productions
Television series by BBC Studios